Edward Everett Grosscup (August 2, 1860 – December 16, 1933) was chairman of the New Jersey Democratic State Committee from 1911 to 1919 and Treasurer of the State of New Jersey from 1913 to 1915. In 1916 he became the New Jersey state purchasing agent.

Biography
He was born on August 2, 1860, in Bridgeton, New Jersey to Charles Christopher Grosscup and Anna Dare Hires.

He married Sarah E. Finlaw (1858-1884) on October 19, 1881, in Camden, New Jersey and had as their child, Walter Truman Grosscup (1883-1950).

After the death of his first wife he married Anna Josephine Swaney (1861-1907) on July 10, 1885 in Camden and had as their children: George Charles Grosscup (1887-1936), and Ethel Amanda Grosscup (1891-1949).

Grosscup had made an unsuccessful run in Cumberland County for sheriff in 1896, and lost a race for a seat in the New Jersey Senate in 1898 to Edward C. Stokes, a Republican who would later be elected as Governor. He moved to Gloucester County in 1899, settling in Wenonah, later making an unsuccessful run for Congress, opposing Henry Clay Loudenslager.

He was elected Treasurer of the State of New Jersey in 1913 replacing Daniel Spader Voorhees. He married for a third time, Florence Steele (1895-?) on June 17, 1914.

He became the state purchasing agent for New Jersey on March 21, 1916.

He died on December 16, 1933 in Philadelphia, Pennsylvania at age 73.

Footnotes

1860 births
1933 deaths
New Jersey Democrats
People from Bridgeton, New Jersey
People from Wenonah, New Jersey
State treasurers of New Jersey